Mahnomen is a city in Mahnomen County, Minnesota, United States, along the Wild Rice River. The population was 1,214 at the 2010 census. It is the county seat of Mahnomen County.

U.S. Highway 59 and Minnesota State Highway 200 are two of the main routes in Mahnomen.

History
"Mahnomen" comes from the Ojibwe name for wild rice.

A post office called Mahnomen has been in operation since 1904. Mahnomen City Hall is listed on the National Register of Historic Places.

Education
The city is served by Mahnomen ISD 432.

Geography

Climate

Demographics

2010 census
As of the census of 2010, there were 1,214 people, 529 households, and 293 families living in the city. The racial makeup of the city was 59.3% White, 0.2% African American, 31.2% Native American, 0.1% Asian, and 9.2% from two or more races. Hispanic or Latino of any race were 1.8% of the population.

There were 529 households, of which 24.8% had children under the age of 18 living with them, 32.3% were married couples living together, 14.7% had a female householder with no husband present, 8.3% had a male householder with no wife present, and 44.6% were non-families. 36.5% of all households were made up of individuals, and 16.5% had someone living alone who was 65 years of age or older. The average household size was 2.20 and the average family size was 2.81.

The median age in the city was 44.8 years. 22.4% of residents were under the age of 18; 6.8% were between the ages of 18 and 24; 21.1% were from 25 to 44; 28% were from 45 to 64; and 21.7% were 65 years of age or older. The gender makeup of the city was 49.3% male and 50.7% female.

2000 census
As of the census of 2000, there were 1,202 people, 532 households, and 311 families living in the city. The racial makeup of the city was 74.29% White, 0.08% African American, 16.06% Native American, and 9.57% from two or more races. Hispanic or Latino of any race were 1.08% of the population.

There were 532 households, out of which 25.9% had children under the age of 18 living with them, 42.5% were married couples living together, 12.6% had a female householder with no husband present, and 41.4% were non-families. 37.4% of all households were made up of individuals, and 25.6% had someone living alone who was 65 years of age or older. The average household size was 2.16 and the average family size was 2.85.

In the city, the population was spread out, with 23.3% under the age of 18, 5.0% from 18 to 24, 21.9% from 25 to 44, 22.7% from 45 to 64, and 27.1% who were 65 years of age or older. The median age was 45 years. For every 100 females, there were 87.8 males. For every 100 females age 18 and over, there were 77.0 males.

The median income for a household in the city was $26,000, and the median income for a family was $37,500. Males had a median income of $24,479 versus $21,625 for females. The per capita income for the city was $14,538. About 9.8% of families and 14.0% of the population were below the poverty line, including 16.1% of those under age 18 and 19.5% of those age 65 or over.

Notable people
Abra J. Powers, Minnesota state legislator and lawyer, lived in Mahnomen.
Nicholas Spaeth, North Dakota Attorney General, was born in Mahnomen.

References

External links
 Official City of Mahnomen, Minnesota web site

Cities in Minnesota
Cities in Mahnomen County, Minnesota
County seats in Minnesota